Glomalin is a glycoprotein produced abundantly on hyphae and spores of arbuscular mycorrhizal (AM) fungi in soil and in roots.  Glomalin was discovered in 1996 by Sara F. Wright, a scientist at the USDA Agricultural Research Service.  The name comes from Glomerales, an order of fungi. Most AM fungi are of the division Glomeromycota. An elusive substance, it is mostly known from its glue-like effect on soil and has not yet been isolated.

Definition and controversy 
The specific protein glomalin has not yet been isolated and described. What has been described is an extraction process involving heat and citrate, producing mixture containing a substance that is reactive to a monoclonal antibody Mab32B11 raised against crushed AM fungi spores. The substance is then provisionally named "glomalin". As many laboratories do not have the equipment to perform an antibody-based isolation (ELISA), a crude mixture called glomalin-related soil proteins (GRSP) is used to refer to the extract portion reactive to the Bradford protein assay. There is significant confusion between the ideal glomalin protein, the antibody-reactive extract portion termed "glomalin", and GRSP.

"Glomalin" was first identified by the Mab32B11 assay in 1987. It eluded extraction until 1996 because, according to its discoverer Sarah F. Wright, "It requires an unusual effort to dislodge glomalin for study: a bath in citrate combined with heating at 250 °F (121 °C) for at least an hour.... No other soil glue found to date required anything as drastic as this." However, using advanced analytical methods in 2010, the citrate-heating extraction procedure for GRSP was proven to co-extract humic substances, so it is still not clear if this "glue effect" comes from glomalin or the other substances that are co-extracted using that method.

Description 

Based on her extraction, Wright thinks the "glomalin molecule is a clump of small glycoproteins with iron and other ions attached... glomalin contains from 1 to 9% tightly bound iron.... We've seen glomalin on the  outside of hyphae, and we believe this is how the hyphae seal themselves so they can carry water and nutrients. It may also be what gives them the rigidity they need to span the air spaces between soil particles." Sampled GRSP takes 7–42 years to biodegrade and is thought to contribute up to 30 percent of the soil carbon where mycorrhizal fungi is present. The highest levels of GRSP were found in volcanic soils of Hawaii and Japan.

There is other circumstantial evidence to show that glomalin is of AM fungal origin. When AM fungi are eliminated from soil through incubation of soil without host plants, the concentration of GRSP declines. A similar decline in GRSP has also been observed in incubated soils from forested, afforested, and agricultural land and grasslands treated with fungicide.  Concentrations of glomalin in soil are correlated with the primary productivity of an ecosystem.

The chemistry of GRSP is not yet fully understood, and the link between glomalin, GRSP, and AM fungi is not yet clear.  The physiological function of glomalin in fungi is also a topic of current research.

Effects
GRSPs, along with humic acid, are a significant component of soil organic matter and act to bind mineral particles together, improving soil quality.  Glomalin has been investigated for its carbon and nitrogen storing properties, including as a potential method of carbon sequestration.

Glomalin is hypothesized to improve soil aggregate stability and decrease soil erosion. A strong correlation has been found between GRSP and soil aggregate water stability in a wide variety of soils where organic material is the main binding agent, although the mechanism is not known.

See also
Carbon cycle
Humus
Mycorrhizal fungi and soil carbon storage
Soil life
Soil structure

References

Glycoproteins
Soil biology
Soil chemistry
Fungal proteins